Tyśmienica  is a village in the administrative district of Gmina Parczew, within Parczew County, Lublin Voivodeship, in eastern Poland.

The village has a population of 680.

References

Villages in Parczew County
Kholm Governorate
Lublin Voivodeship (1919–1939)